"Why, Why, Why" is a song co-written and recorded by American country music artist Billy Currington. It was released in February 2006 as the second single from his 2005 album Doin' Somethin' Right.  The song peaked at number 13 on the U.S. Billboard Hot Country Songs chart and at number 99 on the Billboard Hot 100. Currington co-wrote this song with Mark Nesler and Tony Martin.

Chart performance
"Why, Why, Why" debuted at number 54 on the U.S. Billboard Hot Country Songs chart for the week of March 11, 2006.

Year-end charts

References

2006 singles
Billy Currington songs
Songs written by Mark Nesler
Songs written by Tony Martin (songwriter)
Mercury Nashville singles
Song recordings produced by Carson Chamberlain
Songs written by Billy Currington
2005 songs